Kawkareik Township (Phlone ; ,) is a township of Kawkareik District in the Karen State of Myanmar. The principal town is Kawkareik. Kawkareik township is the second most populated township in Karen State and there are many small villages inside.

References 

Townships of Kayin State